Jonathan Palmer (born December 3, 1983) is a former American football offensive lineman. He was signed by the Philadelphia Eagles as an undrafted free agent in 2007. He played college football at Auburn.

Palmer was also a member of the Carolina Panthers, Oakland Raiders, New York Giants, Cleveland Browns, Pittsburgh Steelers, Arizona Cardinals, Jacksonville Jaguars, Virginia Destroyers and Tennessee Titans.

External links
Auburn Tigers bio

1983 births
Living people
People from Decatur, Georgia
Sportspeople from DeKalb County, Georgia
American football offensive guards
American football offensive tackles
Auburn Tigers football players
Philadelphia Eagles players
Pittsburgh Steelers players
Oakland Raiders players
New York Giants players
Cleveland Browns players
Carolina Panthers players
Arizona Cardinals players
Jacksonville Jaguars players
Virginia Destroyers players
Tennessee Titans players